1D-LSD (1-(1,2-dimethylcyclobutane-1-carbonyl)-lysergic acid diethylamide) is a psychotropic substance and a research chemical that has psychedelic effects. It is believed to be a prodrug for LSD and thought to replace 1V-LSD in Germany after 1V-LSD became covered by the German NpSG law in 2022.

See also 

 1V-LSD
 LSD

References 

Designer drugs
Psychedelic drugs
Lysergamides
Prodrugs
Cyclobutanes